Hellinsia lacteodactylus is a moth of the family Pterophoridae described by Vactor Tousey Chambers in 1873. It is found in North America, including Florida, Mississippi, Kentucky, North Carolina, Colorado, Nova Scotia and British Columbia.

The wingspan is 25–29 mm. Adults are on wing from May to July.

The larvae feed on Solidago species and Eupatorium perfoliatum. They are stemborers.

References

Moths described in 1873
lacteodactylus
Moths of North America